Tracey Jacobs is an American talent agent.  She is a partner at United Talent Agency and a member of the company's board of directors.

Early life and education
Jacobs was raised in Glencoe, Illinois.  She attended Boston University, graduating from the College of Arts and Sciences in 1979.

Career
Following her college graduation, Jacobs moved to Chicago, where she worked as an advertising copywriter for Leo Burnett Worldwide.  While visiting a friend in Los Angeles, she came across a help wanted ad for a children's agent, and although she had no prior experience, she landed the $12,00-a-year job.  Among others, she represented Jason and Justine Bateman.  She booked Justine Bateman on the hit television series, Family Ties; it was Bateman's first role as a professional actor.

In 1987 she was hired by Sam Cohn as an agent at ICM.  She later said Cohn was her mentor. She signed Johnny Depp in 1988 after seeing him in an episode of 21 Jump Street. Described as "responsible for turning him into a global superstar," Jacobs secured defining roles for Depp early in his career; among other films, he starred in What's Eating Gilbert Grape, Edward Scissorhands and Sweeney Todd.

Jacobs joined UTA in 1998 and became a member of the company's board of directors in 2008.  The first female board member in UTA's history, her roster included Harrison Ford, Gwyneth Paltrow, Tim Robbins, Jennifer Lopez,  and Megan Mullally.

In addition to his business managers and his publicist, Depp fired Jacobs in 2016. He reportedly earned more than $650 million while Jacobs represented him.

References

American talent agents
People from Glencoe, Illinois
Boston University College of Arts and Sciences alumni
Year of birth missing (living people)
Living people